Pterocryptis furnessi is a species of catfish in the family Siluridae (the sheatfishes) endemic to Malaysia, where it occurs in the Niah and Baram river basins in Sarawak, on the island of Borneo. Individuals of this species can reach a maximum length of  TL.

References

Silurus
Freshwater fish of East Malaysia
Fauna of Brunei
Taxa named by Henry Weed Fowler
Fish described in 1905
Taxonomy articles created by Polbot
Freshwater fish of Borneo